Toinette is a French given name in use in French speaking countries as a short form of Antoinette. Notable people with this name include the following:

Middle name
Kay Toinette Oslin, known as K. T. Oslin, (1942-2020), American singer
Marie-Lizza Toinette Danila, known as Lizza Danila (born 1982), Filipino swimmer

Fictional characters
Toinette, 1991 Cesar-Award-winning film Tous les Matins du Monde based on 1991 novel All the World's Mornings
Toinette, 1930 Oscar nominated film The Big Pond

See also

Tonette (given name)
Tionette Stoddard

Notes

French feminine given names